Germany predominantly sources its energy from fossil fuels, followed by wind, nuclear power, solar, biomass (wood and biofuels) and hydro.

The German economy is large and developed, ranking fourth in the world by nominal GDP. Germany is seventh in global primary energy consumption as of 2020. As of 2021, German primary energy consumption amounted to 12,193 Petajoule, with more than 75% coming from fossil sources, 6.2% from nuclear energy and 16.1% from renewables. In 2021 Germany's electricity production reached 553.9 TWh, down from 631.4 TWh in 2013.

Key to Germany's energy policies and politics is the "Energiewende", meaning "energy turnaround" or "energy transformation". The policy includes phasing out nuclear power by 2022, and progressive replacement of fossil fuels by renewables. The nuclear electricity production lost in Germany's phase-out was primarily replaced with coal electricity production and electricity importing. One study found that the nuclear phase-out caused $12 billion in social costs per year, primarily due to increases in mortality due to exposure to pollution from fossil fuels.

Germany is highly dependent on Russian energy, as it gets more than half of the natural gas, a third of heating oil, and half of its coal imports from Russia. Due to this reliance, Germany blocked, delayed or watered down EU proposals to cut Russian energy imports amid the 2022 Russian invasion of Ukraine. However, the Russian invasion resulted in a radical shift in Germany's energy policy, with the goal of being almost completely independent of Russian energy imports by mid-2024.

Energy consumption 

Germany is the sixth largest consumer of energy in the world, and the largest national market of electricity in Europe. The country is the fifth-largest consumer of oil in the world. Oil consumption accounted for 34.3% of all energy use in 2018, and 23.7% of Germany's energy consumption came from gas.

Energy imports 
In 2021, Germany imported 63.7% of its energy.

About 98% of oil consumed in Germany is imported. In 2021, Russia supplied 34.1% of crude oil imports, the US 12.5%, Kazakhstan 9.8% and Norway 9.6%.

Germany is also the world's largest importer of natural gas, which covered more than a quarter of primary energy consumption in Germany in 2021. Around 95% of Germany's natural gas is imported, of which around half is re-exported. 55% of gas imports come from Russia, 30% from Norway and 13% from the Netherlands. As of 2022, Germany does not have LNG terminals, so all gas imports use pipelines. After the 2022 Russian invasion of Ukraine, Germany announced that it wanted to build an LNG terminal at the North Sea port of Brunsbüttel to improve energy security.

Because of its rich coal deposits, Germany has a long tradition of using coal. It was the fourth-largest consumer of coal in the world as of 2016. Domestic hard coal mining has been completely phased out in 2018, as it could not compete with cheaper sources elsewhere and had survived only through subsidies. As of 2022, only lignite is still mined in Germany. After ending domestic production in 2018, Germany imported all 31.8 million tonnes of the hard coal it consumed in 2020. The biggest suppliers were Russia (45.4%), the United States (18.3%) and Australia (12.3%).

Electricity production

Coal power 

Coal is the second-largest source of electricity in Germany. , around 24% of the electricity in the country is generated from coal. This was down from 2013, when coal made up about 45% of Germany's electricity production (19% from hard coal and 26% from lignite).  Nonetheless, in the first half of 2021, coal was the largest source of electricity in the country.

Germany is also a major producer of coal. Lignite is extracted in the extreme western and eastern parts of the country, mainly in Nordrhein-Westfalen, Sachsen and Brandenburg. Considerable amounts are burned in coal plants near the mining areas to produce electricity and transporting lignite over far distances is not economically feasible; therefore, the plants are located near the extraction sites. Bituminous coal is mined in Nordrhein-Westfalen and Saarland. Most power plants burning bituminous coal operate on imported material, therefore, the plants are located not only near to the mining sites, but throughout the country.

German coal-fired power plants are being designed and modified so they can be increasingly flexible to support the fluctuations resulting from increased renewable energy. Existing power plants in Germany are designed to operate flexibly. Load following is achieved by German natural gas combined cycle plants and coal-fired power plants. New coal-fired power plants have a minimum load capability of approximately 40%, with further potential to reduce this to 20–25%. The reason is that the output of the coal boiler is controlled via direct fuel combustion and not, as is the case with a gas combined-cycle power plant, via a heat recovery steam generator with an upstream gas turbine.

Germany has been opening new coal power plants until recently, following a 2007 plan to build 26 new coal plants. This has been controversial in light of Germany's commitment to curbing carbon emissions. By 2015, the growing share of renewable energy in the national electricity market (26% in 2014, up from 4% in 1990) and the government's mandated CO2 emission reduction targets (40% below 1990 levels by 2020; 80% below 1990 levels by 2050) have increasingly curtailed previous plans for new, expanded coal power capacity.

On 26 January 2019, a group of federal and state leaders as well as industry representatives, environmentalists, and scientists made an agreement to close all 84 coal plants in the country by 2038.
The move is projected to cost 40 billion in compensation alone to closed businesses.
Coal was used to generate almost 40% of the country's electricity in 2018 and is expected to be replaced by renewable energy and natural gas.
24 coal plants are planned to be closed by 2022 with all but 8 closed by 2030.
The final date is expected to be assessed every 3 years.

In 2019 the import of coal rose 1.4% compared with 2018.

Nuclear power 

Nuclear power has been a topical political issue in recent decades, with continuing debates about when the technology should be phased out. A coalition government of Gerhard Schröder took the decision in 2002 to phaseout all nuclear power by 2022. The topic received renewed attention at the start of 2007 due to the political impact of the Russia-Belarus energy dispute and in 2011 after the Fukushima I nuclear accidents in Japan. Within days of the March 2011 Fukushima Daiichi nuclear disaster, large anti-nuclear protests occurred in Germany. Protests continued and, on 29 May 2011, Merkel's government announced that it would close all of its nuclear power plants by 2022. Eight of the seventeen operating reactors in Germany were permanently shut down following Fukushima in 2011. German coal consumption has risen during 2011, 2012 and 2013.

The former chancellor, Angela Merkel, said the phase-out of plants, previously scheduled to go offline as late as 2036, would give Germany a competitive advantage in the renewable energy era, stating, "As the first big industrialized nation, we can achieve such a transformation toward efficient and renewable energies, with all the opportunities that brings for exports, developing new technologies and jobs". Merkel also pointed to Japan's "helplessness" – despite being an industrialised, technologically advanced nation – in the face of its nuclear disaster.

In September 2011, German engineering giant Siemens announced a complete withdrawal from the nuclear industry, as a response to the Fukushima nuclear disaster. Remaining nuclear companies in Germany are E.ON Kernkraft GmbH, Vattenfall Europe Nuclear Energy GmbH, RWE Power AG, and EnBW Energie Baden-Wuerttemberg AG.

Renewable energy 

The share of electricity produced from renewable energy in Germany has increased from 6.3 per cent of the national total in 2000 to over 25 per cent in the first half of 2012. Germany renewable power market grew from 0.8 million residential customers in 2006 to 4.9 million in 2012, or 12.5% of all private households in the country. In 2011, they purchased 15 terawatt-hours (TWh) of green power, and commercial customers bought a further 10.3 TWh. Renewable energy share of gross electricity consumption rose from 10% in 2005 to 20% in 2011. Main renewable electricity sources were in first half of 2012: Wind energy 36.6%, biomass 22.5%, hydropower 14.7%, photovoltaics (solar) 21.2% and biowaste 3.6%. Wood-fire plants fuelled by wood pellets are included in biomass. Half of Germany's timber production is consumed by wood fired plants. Wood fired plants are counted as renewable energy by Germany and the European Union counting them as "carbon neutral".

In 2010, investments totalling 26 billion euros were made in Germany's renewable energies sector. Germany spends about 20 billion euros per year subsidising renewable energy. According to official figures, some 370,000 people in Germany were employed in the renewable energy sector in 2010, especially in small and medium-sized companies. This is an increase of around 8 per cent compared to 2009 (around 339,500 jobs), and well over twice the number of jobs in 2004 (160,500). About two-thirds of these jobs are attributed to the Renewable Energy Sources Act

In the first half of 2012, 25.1% of Germany's electricity supply was produced from renewable energy sources, more than the electricity generated by nuclear power stations.

In end of 2011, the cumulative installed total of renewable power was 65.7GW. Although Germany does not have a very sunny climate, solar photovoltaic power made up 4% of annual electricity consumption. On 25 May 2012, a Saturday, solar power reached a new record, injecting 22 GW of power into the German power grid. This met 50% of the nation's mid-day electricity demand on that day.

In 2016, renewable energy based electricity generation reached 29.5%, but coal remained a factor at 40.1% of total generation. Wind was the leading renewable source at 12.3%, followed by biomass at 7.9% and solar PV at 5.9%.

In 2020, renewable energy reached a share of 50.9% on the German public grid. Wind power made up 27% of total generation, and solar made up 10.5%. Biomass made up 9.7%, and hydro power made up 3.8%. The largest single non-renewable source was brown coal, with 16.8% of generation, followed by nuclear with 12.5%, then hard coal at 7.3%. Gas mainly provides peaking services, allowing for a generation share of 11.6%.

Bioenergy 
In October 2016 the German Biomass Research Center (Deutsches Biomasseforschungszentrum) (DBFZ) launched an online biomass atlas for researchers, investors and the interested public.

Energy efficiency 

The energy efficiency bottom-up index for the whole economy (ODEX) in Germany decreased by 18% between 1991 and 2006, which is equivalent to an energy efficiency improvement by 1.2% per annum on average based on the ODEX, which calculates technical efficiency improvements. Since the beginning of the new century, however, the efficiency improvement measured by the ODEX has slowed down. While a continuous decrease by 1.5%/y could be observed between 1991 and 2001, the decrease in the period from 2001 to 2006 only amounted to 0.5%, which is below the EU-27 level.

By 2030 the German Federal Ministry of the Economy projects an increase in electricity consumption to 658 TWh. The expected increase is due to an expected uptick in electric mobility, more heating through electric heat-pumps, and production of batteries and hydrogen.

Government energy policy 
Germany is the fourth-largest producer of nuclear power in the world, but in 2000, the government and the German nuclear power industry agreed to phase out all nuclear power plants by 2021, as a result of an initiative with a vote result of 513 Yes, 79 No and 8 Empty. The seven oldest reactors were permanently closed after the Fukushima accident. However, being an integral part of the EU's internal electricity market, Germany will continue to consume foreign nuclear electricity even after 2022.
In September 2010, Merkel's government reached a late-night deal which would see the country's 17 nuclear plants run, on average, 12 years longer than planned, with some remaining in production until well into the 2030s. Then, following Fukushima Daiichi nuclear disaster, the government changed its mind again, deciding to proceed with the plan to close all nuclear plants in the country by 2022.

Government policy emphasises conservation and the development of renewable sources, such as solar, wind, biomass, water, and geothermal power. As a result of energy saving measures, energy efficiency (the amount of energy required to produce a unit of gross domestic product) has been improving since the beginning of the 1970s. The government has set the goal of meeting 80% of the country's energy demands from alternative energy by 2050.

After becoming Chancellor of Germany, Angela Merkel expressed concern for overreliance on Russian energy, but she received little support from others in Berlin.

Sustainable energy 
In September 2010, the German government announced a new aggressive energy policy with the following targets:

 Reducing  emissions 40% below 1990 levels by 2020 and 80% below 1990 levels by 2050
 Increasing the relative share of renewable energy in gross energy consumption to 18% by 2020, 30% by 2030 and 60% by 2050
 Increasing the relative share of renewable energy in gross electrical consumption to 35% by 2020 and 80% by 2050
 Increasing the national energy efficiency by cutting electrical consumption 50% below 2008 levels by 2050

Forbes ranked German Aloys Wobben ($3B), founder of Enercon, as the richest person in the energy business (wind power) in Germany in 2013.

Historical data

See also 
 Electricity sector in Germany
 Ende Gelände
 Energy transition in Germany, also known as the Energiewende
 German Renewable Energy Sources Act, also known as the Erneuerbare-Energien-Gesetz
 Renewable energy in Germany
 Economy of Germany

References

External links 

 Electricity/Heat in Germany in 2005 from the International Energy Agency
 Statistical Energy Yearbook, 2012 from Enerdata

 
Germany